The 1965–66 FC Bayern Munich season was the club's first season in Bundesliga, following promotion from the Regionalliga Süd. In addition to the league, Bayern also competed in the DFB-Pokal, winning the domestic cup for the second time in the club's history.

Review and events
Bayern Munich signed  Ramiro Blacut, Dieter Danzberg, Günter Kaussen, Fritz Kosar, Kurt Kroiß, Hans Nowak, Hans Rigotti, Anton Vučkov and Hubert Windsperger. Otto Jaworski, Manfred Schwalm and Norbert Wodarzik left the club.

Match results

Legend

Bundesliga

League fixtures and results

League standings

DFB-Pokal

Squad information

Squad and statistics

Source:

|}

Transfers

In

Out

Sources

FC Bayern Munich seasons
Bayern Munich